James Matthew White (c. 1883 - c. 1935) was a rugby union player who represented Australia.

White, a flanker, was born in Orange, New South Wales and claimed one international rugby caps for Australia, playing against Great Britain, at Sydney, on 30 July 1904.

References

Australian rugby union players
Australia international rugby union players
Year of birth uncertain
Year of death missing
Rugby union flankers
Rugby union players from New South Wales